is a 1999 vertically scrolling shooter arcade game developed by Takumi Corporation and published by Capcom on their CPS-2 arcade system board and ported later that year to the Dreamcast console. The arcade version is notable for using a horizontally aligned monitor (much like Treasure's Radiant Silvergun), something that is considered rare for a vertical shooter. The Dreamcast version had been scheduled to be released in the U.S. in April 2000, before it was delayed to July 18, 2000.

Gameplay and plot

Giga Wing takes place during a fictional war within a steampunk setting. The player controls one of four different futuristic aircraft and must destroy enemy aircraft, tanks, ships, and buildings using both guns and missiles mounted on the aircraft and a limited supply of bombs which damage or destroy all enemies on-screen when used. The game is based on the player(s) trying to destroy a medallion which possesses great power. Many of the bosses use the medallion as a weapon. At the end, it shows that an evil man who pilots a ship called the "Stranger" is the real person who is in control of the Medallion, and was responsible for the war, as well as other conflicts in the past including World War II, and the players fight him three times as a mini-boss and as the last boss. He appears to be a friend of Stuck 30 years ago when the players fight him with Stuck.

There are four different characters in the game: Sinnosuke, Ruby, Isha, and Stuck and each of them has their own individual storyline. Players can also do team play mode that has two characters at once, creating a new storyline. In each storyline, there are two endings. In the bad ending, the character the player uses will sacrifice their life in a kamikaze attack that destroys the Medallion. In team up mode, generally one of the character does this, but sometimes both characters survive. In the good endings for either solo or team play, the characters do not sacrifice themselves.

The player chooses one of four different craft and shoots through seven stages. Each level ends with a boss fight and each game begins with three lives. The option to continue is given when all lives are lost, although the seventh stage is only accessible if the player does not use any continues. Each ship in Giga Wing has three attacks: a normal shot (spray of bullets), reflect (reflects enemy bullets and damages enemy ships in the field), and force bomb (nullifies all on-screen bullets). Defeated ships sometimes drop power-ups. Each ship starts out with two bombs and up to seven can be collected. Each bomb left in reserve after any boss fight gives the player a bonus. Players can increase their score multiplier by collecting medals dropped by defeated ships. Player "rank" is determined by score at the end of each level. The game adjusts the difficulty accordingly.

Release
In February 2021, it was included as part of pack 3 in the Capcom Arcade Stadium compilation for Nintendo Switch.

Reception

The Dreamcast version received "mixed" reviews according to the review aggregation website GameRankings. Game Informer gave the game a favorable review, and Electronic Gaming Monthly gave it a mixed review, both while the game was still in development. Jim Preston of NextGen said that the game "should be packaged with bottles of both Visine and Excedrin." In Japan, Famitsu gave it a score of 28 out of 40.

Also in Japan, Game Machine listed the arcade version in their May 1, 1999 issue as the tenth most-successful arcade game of the month.

Notes

References

External links

Takumi arcade GW site: Takumi arcade, DC
Capcom GW site: arcade, DC
Sega GW site

1999 video games
Arcade video games
Capcom games
Cooperative video games
CP System II games
Dreamcast games
Multiplayer and single-player video games
Vertically scrolling shooters
Video games developed in Japan
Video games scored by Masahiro Yuge
Virgin Interactive games
Takumi Corporation games